The Thorn Birds is a 2009 musical adaptation of the 1977 novel of the same name by Colleen McCullough. The lyrics were written by McCullough herself, the music was composed by Gloria Bruni and it was directed by Michael Bogdanov behind Wales Theatre Company.

It starred Matthew Goodgame as Father Ralph de Bricassart, Helen Anker as Meggie Cleary and Peter Karrie as Cardinal di Conti-Verchese. The cast included Andrea Miller, Kieran Brown, Ieuan Rhys, Phylip Harries, Richard Munday and Llinos Daniel.

The UK tour features visits to Poole, Swansea, Wolverhampton, Aberystwyth, Bradford, Hull, Llandudno, Windsor, Plymouth, Malvern, Birmingham and then finishing in the Wales Millennium Centre, Cardiff in July.

External links

Dominic Cavendish: "The Thorn Birds: Grand Theatre, Swansea". The Telegraph, 24 April 2009
"UK critics pan Thorn Birds musical". ABC News, 28 April 2009
Robert Gould: "Review: The Thorn Birds, the musical - a tragic disaster in Swansea". Broadway World, 22 April 2009
Vanessa Thorpe: "Epic romance is reborn as Thorn Birds, the musical". The Observer, 4 January 2009

2009 musicals
Musicals based on novels